Tunia is an Adamawa language of Chad.

References

Languages of Chad
Bua languages